The Seeley G. Mudd Manuscript Library is the institutional archives of Princeton University and is part of the Princeton University Library's department of special collections. The Mudd Library houses two major collection areas: the history of Princeton and the history of twentieth century public policy.

The Mudd Library was designed by Hugh Stubbins and cost $2.5 million at the time of its construction. It was the first building to be designed under the University's energy conservation program and was dedicated on October 16, 1976. Its creation was supported by the Seeley G. Mudd Foundation. The Library currently holds 42,000 linear feet of archived material.  The building underwent a significant infrastructure renovation in 2020-21, in which the original HVAC, fire suppression, electrical, security, and plumbing systems were modernized, and a number of alterations to the first floor plan led to the creation of an additional seminar room.

Notable collections housed at the Mudd Library

University archives collections 
The university archives collections the records of students and faculty at Princeton University, evidence of the university's business, records of student life, and university publications. The university archives is also the repository for Princeton senior theses and doctoral dissertations. The archives were used extensively in the Princeton and Slavery project.

Public policy collections 
The five major collecting areas for public policy at Mudd Library are foreign policy, jurisprudence, journalism, public policy formation, and international development. The library has collected from individuals and organizations that influenced these areas in the twentieth and twenty first centuries.
 American Civil Liberties Union
 Americans United for Separation of Church and State
 Association on American Indian Affairs
 Bernard Baruch
 James A. Baker III
 Grover Cleveland
 Council on Foreign Relations
 Allen Welsh Dulles
 John Foster Dulles
 Freedom House
 John Marshall Harlan II
 Richard Holbrooke
 George F. Kennan
 Arthur Krock
 George McGovern
 H. Alexander Smith
 Adlai Stevenson
 Paul Volcker
 Woodrow Wilson

References

External links 
 
 Mudd Manuscript Library Blog
 Princeton University Finding Aids

Library buildings completed in 1976
Princeton University buildings
Libraries in New Jersey
University and college academic libraries in the United States
Archives in the United States
Special collections libraries in the United States